Ardabil University of  Medical Sciences is a medical university in Ardabil Province of Iran established in 1993. This university has over than 3400 students are studying in six Schools in Ardabil city including Medicine, Dentistry, Pharmacy, Nursing & Midwifery, health and international Pardis schools. In addition, there are two academic units in other cities of Ardabil province including, nursing college of Germi, health educational institution of Meshkinshahr.

Schools
The university contains below schools:
 Dental
 Health
 Medicine and Para medicine
 health educational institution of Meshkinshahr
 Nursing and Midwifery
 Moghan school of Nursing and Midwifery
 Pharmacy
 International Pardis School

References

External links
Official website

Medical schools in Iran
Universities in Iran
Buildings and structures in Ardabil
Educational institutions established in 1993
1993 establishments in Iran
Education in Ardabil Province